HD 167096, also known as HR 6818 or rarely 4 G. Coronae Australis, is a binary star located in the southern constellation Corona Australis. It has an apparent magnitude of 5.45, making it faintly visible to the naked eye. At its current distance HD 167096's brightness is diminished by three tenths of a magnitudes due to interstellar dust and it has an absolute magnitude of +0.64.

The primary has a stellar classification of G8/K0 III, indicating that it is an evolved red giant with the characteristics of a G8 and K0 giant star. It has 1.11 times the mass of the Sun but it has expanded to 8.92 times the Sun's radius. It has a near solar metallicity at [Fe/H] = −0.02 and spins too slowly for its projected rotational velocity to be measured accurately. This is a binary star that completes a circular orbit within 1.81 years. Since the two components have a separation of only , it makes it difficult to measure their individual properties.

References

G-type giants
K-type giants
Binary stars
High-proper-motion stars
Corona Australis
Coronae Australis, 4
CD-44 12456
167096
089507
6818